Nellie Grace Ibbott OBE (20 June 1889 in Leyton, Essex , England - 25 June 1970 in Mornington, Victoria, Australia) was a British-born Australian mayor. When Ibbott became mayor of Heidelberg, Victoria in 1943, she became the first woman in Victoria to hold mayoral office. In 1950 she was defeated at the council elections after serving for 22 years.

Early life
Nellie Grace Ibbott was born in Leyton, Essex, England to John Charles Pugh, a printing machine manager, and Ellie Beatrice.

References

1889 births
1970 deaths
Women mayors of places in Victoria (Australia)
People from Leyton
Mayors of places in Victoria (Australia)
20th-century Australian politicians
20th-century Australian women politicians
19th-century Australian women
British emigrants to Australia